Atlantic International University, Inc. (AIU) is a private for-profit distance learning university based in Honolulu, Hawaii. It was founded in December 1998 as Atlantic University, Inc. It offers undergraduate and graduate degrees including doctorates.

Accreditation
Although it is based in the United States, AIU is not accredited by a recognized United States accreditation agency. It is accredited by the U.K. Accreditation Service for International Schools, Colleges and Universities (ASIC), but ASIC is not recognized by the United States Secretary of Education.

Atlantic International University was formerly accredited by the non-recognized Accrediting Commission International. It has also been listed as a non-recognized university in other countries including Ghana, Nigeria (in relation to a branch in Okija), and Oman. It has been characterized as a degree mill, and its degrees have been widely dismissed as "fake."

It has been prosecuted by the Office of Consumer Protection of the State of Hawaii for fraudulently claiming to be an accredited institution. In a 2002 case, the state alleged that "AIU is not now and never has been accredited by a recognized accrediting agency or association recognized by the United States Secretary of Education...AIU has failed to properly and adequately disclose in its promotional materials, specifically its agents' advertising, the fact that it is not fully accredited by any nationally recognized accrediting agency or association listed by the United States Secretary of Education in violation of Hawaii Rev. Stat. § 446E-2(a)."

Notable alumni
Hassan Ayariga
Joyce Banda
William Bazeyo
Gideon Gono
David Karpeles, founder of the Karpeles Manuscript Library Museum
Michael Sata
Queenstar Pokuah Sawyerr

References

External links
 Official site

Distance education institutions based in the United States